Politics of Solomon Islands takes place within the framework of a parliamentary representative democratic, constitutional monarchy.  Solomon Islands is an independent Commonwealth realm, where executive power is exercised by the government. Legislative power is vested in both the government and a multi-party parliament.

The head of state, the King or Queen of Solomon Islands, is represented by the Governor-General.  The head of government is the Prime Minister.
Constitutional safeguards include freedom of speech, press, worship, movement, and association. The Judiciary is independent of the executive and the legislature.

Executive branch

The King of Solomon Islands is represented in Solomon Islands by a governor general who acts on the advice of the prime minister and the cabinet. The Governor-General of Solomon Islands is elected by parliament.

Solomon Islands governments are characterized by weak political parties and highly unstable parliamentary coalitions. They are subject to frequent votes of no confidence, and government leadership changes frequently as a result. Cabinet changes are common.

The Prime Minister, elected by Parliament, chooses the other members of the cabinet. Each ministry is headed by a cabinet member, who is assisted by a permanent secretary, a career public servant, who directs the staff of the ministry. The cabinet consists of the Prime Minister and ministers of executive departments. They answer politically to the House of Assembly.

Attorney General of Solomon Islands 
As described in the Constitution of Solomon Islands (1978), the Attorney General is appointed by the Judicial and Legal Service Commission and acts as the principal legal adviser to the Government. The Attorney General of Solomon Islands may serve in an advisory capacity to the parliament, but does not possess any voting rights.

Solicitor General of Solomon Islands 
The Solicitor General of Solomon Islands is the law officer that is below the Attorney General of Solomon Islands.

Ministry of Justice and Legal Affairs 
See Ministry of Justice and Legal Affairs (Solomon Islands)

Legislative branch

The National Parliament has 50 members, elected for a four-year term in single-seat constituencies. Solomon Islands have a multi-party system, with numerous parties in which no one party often has a chance of gaining power alone. Political parties must work with each other to form coalition governments.

Parliament may be dissolved by a majority vote of its members before the completion of its term. Parliamentary representation is based on single-member constituencies. Suffrage is universal for citizens over age 18.

Cabinet and ministries

Judiciary

The Governor General appoints the Chief Justice of the Supreme Court on the advice of the Prime Minister and the Leader of the Opposition. The Governor General appoints the other justices with the advice of a judicial commission.

Political parties and elections

Administrative divisions

For local government, the country is divided into 10 administrative areas, of which nine are provinces administered by elected provincial assemblies, and the 10th is the city of Honiara, administered by the Honiara City Council.

Political history
Solomon Islands governments are characterized by weak political parties and highly unstable parliamentary coalitions. They are subject to frequent votes of no confidence, and government leadership changes frequently as a result. Cabinet changes are common.

The first post-independence government was elected in August 1980. Prime Minister Peter Kenilorea was head of government until September 1981, when he was succeeded by Solomon Mamaloni as the result of a realignment within the parliamentary coalitions. Following the November 1984 elections, Kenilorea was again elected Prime Minister, to be replaced in 1986 by his former deputy Ezekiel Alebua following shifts within the parliamentary coalitions. The next election, held in early 1989, returned Solomon Mamaloni as Prime Minister. Francis Billy Hilly was elected Prime Minister following the national elections in June 1993, and headed the government until November 1994 when four Cabinet Ministers were allegedly bribed by a foreign logging company to shift their parliamentary loyalties and bring Solomon Mamaloni back to power.

The national election of 6 August 1997 resulted in Bartholomew Ulufa'alu's election as Prime Minister, heading a coalition government, which christened itself the Solomon Islands Alliance for Change. In June 2000, an insurrection mounted by militants from the island of Malaita resulted in the brief detention of Ulufa’alu and his subsequent forced resignation. Prior to this Ulufa'alu had requested Australian intervention to stabilise the deteriorating situation in Solomon Islands, which was refused. Manasseh Sogavare, leader of the People's Progressive Party, was chosen Prime Minister by a loose coalition of parties. New elections in December 2001 brought Sir Allan Kemakeza into the Prime Minister's chair with the support of a coalition of parties. Bartholomew Ulufa’alu was Leader of the Opposition.

Kemakeza attempted to address the deteriorating law and order situation in the country, but the prevailing atmosphere of lawlessness, widespread extortion, and ineffective police prompted a formal request by the Solomon Islands Government for outside help. In July 2003, Australian and Pacific Island police and troops arrived in the Solomon Islands under the auspices of the Australian-led Regional Assistance Mission to Solomon Islands (RAMSI). The mission, consisting of a policing effort, military support, and a large development component, largely restored law and order to Honiara and the other provinces of Solomon Islands. Efforts are now underway to identify a donor base and reestablish credible systems of governance and financial management.

In the 2006 legislative election Kemakeza's People's Alliance Party suffered a major defeat, losing more than half its seats. However Deputy Prime Minister Synder Rini succeeded in gaining the support of enough Independent Members of Parliament to form government. This resulted in rioting in the capital of Honiara. Much of the violence was directed at Chinese businessmen who were accused of influencing the election result. Reinforcements to RAMSI stabilised the situation, but not before serious damage was done to the nation's already fragile economy. Rini resigned shortly before a motion of no confidence was due to take place, and was succeeded by Manasseh Sogavare, a former Prime Minister.

The inability of RAMSI to oversee a peaceful election has raised serious doubts about the success of the mission.

Land ownership
Land ownership is reserved for Solomon Islanders. At the time of independence, citizenship was granted to all persons whose parents are or were both British protected persons and members of a group, tribe, or line indigenous to Solomon Islands. The law provides that resident expatriates, such as the Chinese and Kiribati, may obtain citizenship through naturalization.

Land generally is held on a family or village basis and may be handed down from mother or father according to local custom. The islanders are reluctant to provide land for nontraditional economic undertakings, and this has resulted in continual disputes over land ownership.

Military
No military forces are maintained by Solomon Islands, although the Royal Solomon Islands Police Force (RSIP) of nearly 500 includes a border protection element. The police also have responsibility for fire service, disaster relief, and maritime surveillance. The police force is headed by a commissioner, appointed by the Governor General and responsible to the prime minister.

See also
 Foreign relations of Solomon Islands

References

External links
 Parliament of Solomon Islands
 Office of the Prime Minister and Cabinet
 Constitutional Reform Unit
 Office of the Auditor General
 Central Bank of Solomon Islands
 Ministry of Commerce, Industry, Labour and Immigration
 Department of External Trade
 Ministry of Mines and Energy

Politics of the Solomon Islands